Mian Muhammad Azhar (Punjabi and ) is a Pakistani politician and a business oligarch representing Pakistan Tehreek-e-Insaf. He is from an Arain noble and landlord family of Lahore, and remains a major political player of the city. He is a former governor of Punjab (1990-1993) and the founder of PML-Q, of which he was also president until retiring from politics. He is one of the largest steel manufacturers of Pakistan and is the CEO of Afco Steel Industries. He was also the mayor of Lahore between 1987 and 1991.

He is the father of Federal Minister Hammad Azhar.

Education 
Azhar studied at the Hailey College of Commerce in Lahore.

Political career 
Being a close aide of Nawaz Sharif in the past, he was also awarded the National Assembly ticket from NA-95 Lahore-IV, the seat vacated by Nawaz Sharif after the 1988 general elections. Azhar won his seat as a candidate of Islami Jamhoori Ittehad. In 1990, after the dismissal of Benazir Bhutto's first government, he replaced Gen (Rtd.) Tikka Khan as the Governor of Punjab and held the office till 25 April 1993. He, however, left the office, which Muslim League insiders said, was due to differences with Sharif. 

In the 1997 general elections, he was elected as MNA on PML-N ticket from NA-92 (Lahore-I). His relations with Sharif got bitter gradually and finally with the dismissal of Nawaz Sharif's government, he became the head of a new faction of Muslim League called PML-Q. He met President Pervez Musharraf on 25 June 2001, thus becoming the first Pakistani politician to do so.

In the 2002 general elections, while he was a strong candidate for the slot of prime minister. However, in a dramatic way, he lost the National Assembly elections from both seats of Lahore and Sheikhupura. In NA-118 (Lahore-I), he was defeated by independent candidate, Hafiz Salman Butt, who was supported by PML-N and Jamaat-e-Islami, whereas in NA-132 (Sheikhupura-II), he was beaten by PML-N's Mian Jalil Ahmad Sharaqpuri.

Meanwhile, his party managed to form the national government as well as ruling in two provinces amid charges of massive rigging. Without a parliamentary seat, he was replaced by Shujaat Hussain as head of PLM-Q. He also failed to win a seat in the 2008 elections.

He joined the Pakistan Tehreek-e-Insaf in October 2011.

Pakistan Football Federation 
Pakistani football became a hot bed for politics in the early 1990s. In 1990, Pakistan Football Federation held its general elections in which Azhar won the presidency by a margin of one vote, beating the Pakistan Peoples Party leader Faisal Saleh Hayat. Azhar was instrumental in ousting PFF General Secretary Hafiz Salman Butt (a Member of National Assembly of Jamaat-e-Islami) due to political rifts and alleged abuse of power.

Azhar governed the federation till the 2003 elections, when he was beaten by Hayat, who was supported by Butt. By that time, Azhar had fallen out of favour from the pro-Musharraf PML-Q while Hayat’s own pro-Musharraf PPP faction had been growing in power in the run-up to the 2002 General Elections  after which he became the Interior Minister of Pakistan.

References

Living people
Mayors of Lahore
Pakistan Muslim League (N) MNAs
Politicians from Lahore
Punjabi people
Governors of Punjab, Pakistan
Pakistan Muslim League (Q) politicians
Pakistani MNAs 1990–1993
Pakistani MNAs 1997–1999
Pakistan Tehreek-e-Insaf politicians
Year of birth missing (living people)